Friendship was a town in Trinity County, Texas. It was established around the Civil War era. No population estimates are available, but the settlement appears on most highway maps.

References

Former populated places in Texas
Populated places in Trinity County, Texas
Submerged settlements in the United States